Kladeos is a community in Elis in Greece. It is part of the municipality of Olympia. It is 4 km northeast of Olympia and 5 km south of Kryoneri.

References 

Populated places in Elis